Bienvenido Hita (born 2 November 1944) is a Cuban boxer. He competed in the men's lightweight event at the 1964 Summer Olympics.

References

1944 births
Living people
Cuban male boxers
Olympic boxers of Cuba
Boxers at the 1964 Summer Olympics
Place of birth missing (living people)
Lightweight boxers